The Robert G. Griffith Sr. House is a historic house near Summit, Blount County, Alabama.  The two-story I-house was built in 1851 for Robert Griffin Griffith.  As the only surviving early I-house in Blount County, the dwelling is representative of the residence of a financially comfortable agricultural family in the Appalachian region of Alabama.  It was added to the Alabama Register of Landmarks and Heritage on June 30, 1995, and to the National Register of Historic Places on March 14, 2000.

References

National Register of Historic Places in Blount County, Alabama
Houses on the National Register of Historic Places in Alabama
I-houses in Alabama
Houses in Blount County, Alabama
Houses completed in 1851
Properties on the Alabama Register of Landmarks and Heritage
1851 establishments in Alabama